Amitosis (a- + mitosis), also called karyostenosis or direct cell division or binary fission, is cell proliferation that does not occur by mitosis, the mechanism usually identified as essential for cell division in eukaryotes. The polyploid macronucleus found in ciliates divides amitotically. While normal mitosis results in a precise division of parental alleles, amitosis results in a random distribution of parental alleles. Ploidy levels of >1000 in some species means both parental alleles can be maintained over many generations, while species with fewer numbers of each chromosome will tend to become homozygous for one or the other parental allele through a process known as phenotypic or allelic assortment.

It does not involve maximal condensation of chromatin into chromosomes, observable by light microscopy as they line up in pairs along the metaphase plate.  It does not involve these paired structures being pulled in opposite directions by a mitotic spindle to form daughter cells. Rather, it effects nuclear proliferation without the involvement of chromosomes, unsettling for cell biologists who have come to rely on the mitotic figure as reassurance that chromatin is being equally distributed into daughter cells.  The phenomenon of amitosis, even though it is an accepted as occurring in ciliates, continues to meet with skepticism about its role in mammalian cell proliferation, perhaps because it lacks the reassuring iconography of mitosis.  Of course the relatively recent discovery of copy number variations (CNVs) in mammalian cells within an organ significantly challenges the age-old assumption that every cell in an organism must inherit an exact copy of the parental genome to be functional.  Rather than CNVs resulting from mitosis gone awry, some of this variation may arise from amitosis, and may be both desirable and necessary.  Furthermore, ciliates possess a mechanism for adjusting copy numbers of individual genes during amitosis of the macronucleus.

Amitosis was first described in 1880 by Walther Flemming (more celebrated for describing mitosis) and others (Child, 1907). For a few years thereafter, it was common for biologists to think cells sometimes divided by mitosis but at other times could divide by amitosis. However, since the turn of the twentieth century, amitosis has not received much attention.  Using "mitosis in mammalian cells" as a search term in the Medline data-base calls up more than 10,000 studies dealing with mitosis, whereas "amitosis in mammalian cells" retrieves the titles of fewer than 50 papers.  This absence of data has led many scientists to conclude that amitosis does not exist, or is minimally important—if any means of proliferation can be deemed "minimally important" while the war on cancer is not yet won.

Accordingly, a resurgence of interest in the role of amitosis in mammalian proliferation has been building over the past two to three decades.  A review of the resulting literature not only affirms the involvement of amitosis in cell proliferation, it also explores the existence of more than one amitotic mechanism capable of producing "progeny nuclei" without the involvement of "mitotic chromosomes."  One form of amitosis involves fissioning, a nucleus splitting in two without the involvement of chromosomes, and has been reported in  placental tissue as well as in cells grown from that tissue in rats, in human trophoblasts, and in mouse trophoblasts.  Amitosis by fissioning has also been reported in mammalian liver cells and human adrenal cells.  Chen and Wan not only reported amitosis in rat liver, but also presented a mechanism for a four-stage amitotic process whereby chromatin threads are reproduced and equally distributed to daughter cells as the nucleus splits in two.

Additional examples of non-mitotic proliferation, and important insights into underlying mechanisms, have resulted from extensive work with polyploid cells.  Such cells, long acknowledged to exist, were once believed simply to be anomalous.  Accumulating research, including in the liver now suggests that cells containing multiple copies of the genome are importantly involved in a cell's ability to adapt to its environment.  A couple of decades of research has shown that polyploid cells are frequently "reduced" to diploid cells by amitosis (Zybina et al.). For instance, naturally occurring polyploid placental cells have been shown capable of producing nuclei with diploid or near-diploid complements of DNA.  Furthermore, Zybina and her colleagues have demonstrated that such nuclei, derived from polyploid placental cells, receive one or more copies of a microscopically identifiable region of the chromatin, demonstrating that even without the reassuring iconography of identical chromosomes being distributed into "identical" daughter cells, this particular amitotic process results in representative transmission of chromatin.  Studying rat polyploid trophoblasts, this research group has shown that the nuclear envelope of the giant nucleus is involved in this subdivision of a highly polyploid nucleus into low-ploidy nuclei.  Polyploid cells are also at the heart of experiments to determine how some cells may survive chemotherapy.  Erenpreisa and colleagues have shown that following treatment of cultured cells with mitosis-inhibiting chemicals (similar to what is used in some chemotherapy), a small population of induced polyploid cells survives.  Eventually this population can give rise to "normal" diploid cells by formation of polyploid chromatin bouquets that return to an interphase state, and separate into several secondary nuclei.  Intriguing phenomena including controlled autophagic degradation of some DNA as well as production of nuclear envelope-limited sheets accompanies the process.  Since neither of these depolyploidizations involves mitotic chromosomes, they conform to the broad definition of amitosis.

There are also multiple reports of amitosis occurring when nuclei bud out through the plasma membrane of a polyploid cell.  Such a process has been shown to occur in amniotic cells transformed by a virus as well as in mouse embryo fibroblast lines exposed to carcinogens.  A similar process called extrusion has been described for mink trophoblasts, a tissue in which fissioning is also observed.  Asymmetric cell division has also been described in polyploid giant cancer cells and low eukaryotic cells and reported to occur by the amitotic processes of splitting, budding, or burst-like mechanisms.  Similarly, two different kinds of amitosis have been described in monolayers of Ishikawa endometrial cells (Fleming, 2014)

An example of amitosis particularly suited to the formation of multiple differentiated nuclei in a reasonably short period of time has been shown to occur during the differentiation of fluid-enclosing hemispheres called domes from adherent Ishikawa endometrial monolayer cells during an approximately 20-hour period. (Fleming 1995; Fleming, 1999)  Aggregates of nuclei from monolayer syncytia become enveloped in mitochondrial membranes, forming structures (mitonucleons) that become elevated as a result of vacuole formation during the initial 6 hours of differentiation (Fleming 1998; Fleming, 2015a).  Over the next 4 or 5 hours,  chromatin from these aggregated nuclei becomes increasingly pycnotic, eventually undergoing karyolysis and karyorrhexis in the now-elevated predome structures (Fleming, 2015b).  In other systems such changes accompany apoptosis but not in the differentiating Ishikawa cells, where the processes appear to accompany changes in DNA essential for the newly created differentiated dome cells.  Finally,  the chromatin filaments emerging from these processes form a mass from which dozens of dome nuclei are amitotically generated (Fleming, 2015c) over a period of approximately 3 hours with the apparent involvement of nuclear envelope-limited sheets.

That all of this may be an iceberg tip is suggested by research from Walter Thilly's laboratory.  Examination of fetal gut (5 to 7 weeks), colonic adenomas, and adenocarcinomas has revealed nuclei that look like hollow bells encased in tubular syncytia.  These structures can divide symmetrically by an amitotic nuclear fission process, forming new "bells".  Or they can fission asymmetrically resulting in one of seven other nuclear morphotypes, five of which appear to be specific to development since they are rarely observed in adult organisms.

The research that is accumulating about amitosis suggests that such processes are, indeed, involved in the production of the 37 trillion or so cells in humans, perhaps particularly during the fetal and embryonic phases of development when the majority of these cells are produced, perhaps within the complexity of implantation, perhaps when large numbers of cells are being differentiated, and perhaps in cancerous cells.

A word of caution: some examples of cell division formerly thought to belong to this "non-mitotic" class, such as the division of some unicellular eukaryotes, may actually occur by the process of "closed mitosis" different from open or semi-closed mitotic processes, all involving mitotic chromosomes and classified by the fate of the nuclear envelope.

References

Further reading 
Child CM. 1907 Amitosis as a factor in normal and regulatory growth. Anat Anz. 30: 271–97.

Coleman SJ,  Gerza L,  JonesCJ,  Sibley CP,  Aplin JD,  Heazell AEP. 2013. Syncytial nuclear

Fleming H. 1995 Differentiation in human endometrial cells in monolayer culture: Dependence on a factor in fetal bovine serum J.Cell Biochem. 57:262-270.

Fleming H, Condon R, Peterson G, Guck I, Prescott E, Chatfield K, Duff M. 1998. Role of biotin-containing membranes and nuclear distribution in differentiating human endometrial cells.  Journal of Cellular Biochemistry. 71(3): 400–415.

Fleming H. 1999 Structure and function of cultured endometrial epithelial cells. Semin Reprod Endocrinol.17(1):93-106.

Fleming H. 2014 Unusual characteristics of opaque Ishikawa endometrial cells include the envelopment of chromosomes with material containing endogenous biotin in the latter stages of cytokinesis 

Fleming H. 2016a. Mitonucleons formed during Differentiation of Ishikawa Endometrial Epithelial Cells are involved in Vacuole Formation that Elevates Monolayer Cells into Domes. Differentiation of Ishikawa Domes, Part 1, 

Fleming H. 2016b. Pyknotic chromatin in mitonucleons elevating in syncytia undergo karyorhhexis and karyolysis before coalescing into an irregular chromatin mass: Differentiation of Ishikawa Domes, Part 2, 

Fleming H. 2016c. Chromatin mass from previously aggregated, pyknotic, and fragmented monolayer nuclei is a source for dome cell nuclei generated by amitosis: Differentiation of Ishikawa Domes, Part 3, 

Güttinger, S; Laurell, E; Kutay, U (2009), "Orchestrating nuclear envelope disassembly and reassembly during mitosis", Nat Rev Mol Cell Biol 10 (3): 178–191, 

Isakova GK, Shilova IE. 2000. Reproduction by "budding" of the trophoblast cells in the mink implanting blastocysts. Dokl Biol Sci.  371:214-6.

Schoenfelder KP, Fox DT 2015 The expanding implications of polyploidy. J Cell Biol.  25;209(4):485-91. .

Thilly WG, Gostjeva EV, Koledova VV, Zukerberg LR, Chung D, Fomina JN, Darroudi F, Stollar BD. 2014. Metakaryotic stem cell nuclei use pangenomic dsRNA/DNA intermediates in genome replication and segregation. Organogenesis.  10(1):44-52. . Epub 2014 Jan 13.

Walen KH. 2004. Spontaneous cell transformation: karyoplasts derived from multinucleated cells produce new cell growth in senescent human epithelial cell cultures. In Vitro Cell Dev Biol Anim. 40(5-6):150-8.

Zybina EV, Zybina TG, Bogdanova MS, Stein GI  2005 Cell Biol Int. 29 (12): 1066-1070

Cell cycle